Bhaskaravarman (600–650) was king of medieval Kamarupa and the last of the Varman dynasty. After being captured by the Gauda king during the reign of his father, he was able to re-establish the rule of the Varman's. He made political alliances with Harshavardhana of Thaneswar, against the alliance of the Gauda and East Malwa. He was visited by Xuanzang and Wang Xuance, the envoys of the Tang dynasty who have left accounts of the king and the kingdom.

Bhaskaravarman came to power after his brother Supratisthitavarman died. He was the first Kamarupa king to claim descent from the mythical Narakasura, Bhagadatta and Vajradatta. After his death, Salasthambha, who established the Mlechchha dynasty, acquired power in Kamarupa Kingdom.

He issued the Dubi and Nidhanpur copper plate grants, re-issued after his ancestor Bhutivarman, and a clay seal found in Nalanda.

Background
After Susthitavarman was defeated by Mahasenagupta, his son Supratisthitavarman came to power, who built Kamarupa's elephant army but died prematurely without an heir. Thus, the younger son, Bhaskaravarman, came to power in Kamarupa. Even after he succeeded to the throne , Bhaskaravarman was known as kumara (prince).

Rivals
Mahasenagupta, in alliance with Shashanka, defeated Susthitavarman and took control over north and central Bengal. After the death of Mahasenagupta, Shashanka became the ruler of this portion.   Shortly after, Bhaskaravarman found two rivals in northern India. Nne in central and northern Bengal under Shashanka and the other in mid-India under Prabhakaravardhana, the father of Harshavardhana.

When Shashanka murdered Rajyavardhana who had succeeded Prabhakaravardhana as the king at Thaneswar, Bhaskaravarman sent an envoy, Hangsavega, to form an alliance. This incident was recorded by both Bana and Xuanzang.

Alliance with Harsha
The Harsha Charita of Bana gives a detailed account of Hangsavega's meeting with Harsha. Plying him with gifts and praise, the diplomat was able to effect an offensive and defensive alliance between the two kings.

The Nidhanpur copper-plate grant was issued from Bhaskaravarman's victorious camp at Karnasuvarna, the erstwhile capital of Shashanka.

Chinese accounts

Xuanzang's account
The Chinese traveller, Xuanzang, visited Bhaskaravarman in his court on his invitation, and noted that the King patronised Buddhism though a non-Buddhist. According to the text of the Si-yu-ki, the circumference of the capital of Kamarupa was thirty li. It further claims Bhaskarvarman to be a Brahmana, contradicting the text She-Kia-Fang-Che which claims Bhaskarvarman to be a kshatriya whose ancestors came from China.  According to Suniti Kumar Chatterjee Bhaskaravarman was a Hinduised Mlechcha king of Indo-Mongoloid origin.

Wang Xuance's account
After 648 CE the Chinese emperor Tang Taizong of the Tang dynasty sent a return emissary Wang Xuance to Harshavardhana's court.  Harsha had died in the meantime and his successor drove out the mission.  Wang returned with an army, imprisoned the successor king and took him back to China.  In the military mission, Bhaskaravarman helped Wang with supplies of cattle, horse and accouterments.  Bhaskaravarman is recorded as Ch-Kieu-mo (Sri-Kumara) and his kingdom as Kia-mu-lu (Kamarupa).  During the audience Bhaskaravarman is said to have given Wang a map and asked for an image of Laozi.

Kamarupa of Bhaskaravarman
Xuanzang, in his travelogue, noted that he crossed a great river Karatoya before entering the Kamarupa. The eastern boundary was a line of hills close to the Chinese frontier. He also said Kamarupa was nearly 1700 miles in circumference. The climate was genial. He mentioned that the people were are short height and of yellow complexion and Bhaskar Varman was Hindu and not Buddhist. The people were honest. Their speech differed a little from that of mid-India. They were of violent disposition but were persevering students. They worshipped the Devas and did not believe in Buddhism. The Deva-temples were some hundreds in number and the various systems had some myriads of professed adherents. The few Buddhists in the country performed their acts of devotion in secret. The pilgrim ascertained from the people that to the east of the country was a series of hills which reached as far as the confines of China. The inhabitants of these hills were akin to the "Man of the Lao". In the south-east of the country elephants were plentiful.

Description
Xuanzang notes that Kamarupa was low and moist, and that the crops were regular. Coconuts and jackfruits grew abundantly and were appreciated by the people.  The description provided is around the present-day Guwahati.

As Edward Albert Gait has pointed out, this circumference must have included the whole of the Assam valley, Surma valley, parts of North Bengal, and parts of Mymensingh.

Religion
Bhaskaravarman was a worshiper of Shiva, though he had great reverence for learned Buddhist priests and professors of his time, and was distinctly inclined towards Buddhism.  The general populace worshiped the Devas worshiped in many temples, and adherents of Buddhism practised devotion secretly.

Culture
According to Xuanzang, the people of Kamarupa were honest, albeit with a violent disposition, but were persevering students. The people were short in height and of yellow complexion. Their speech differed from that of mid-India. The Nidhanpur grant issued from Karnasuvarna contained local literary forms and offices not found in subsequent Kamarupa inscriptions.

Art and industry
The gifts from Bhaskaravarman to Harshavardhana contained mostly products of the land—royal umbrella of exquisite workmanship studded with valuable gems, puthis written on Sachi-bark, dyed cane-mats, Agar-essence, musk in silk-bags, liquid molasses in earthen-pots, utensils, paintings, a pair of Brahmini ducks in a cage made of cane and overlaid with gold, and a considerable quantity of silk-fabrics indicating industry was rudimentary.

Nidhanpur inscription

In his Nidhanpur copper-plate inscription Bhaskaravarman is said to have revealed the light of the Arya religion by dispelling the accumulated darkness of Kali age, by making a judicious application of his revenues; who has equalled the prowess of the whole ring of his feudatories by the strength of his own arm, who has derived many a way of enjoyment for his hereditary subjects whose loyal devotion to him was augmented by his steadiness, modesty and affability, who is adorned with a wonderful ornament of splendid fame made of the flowery words of praise variously composed by hundreds of kings vanquished by him in battle; whose virtuous activities, like those of Sivi, were applied in making gifts for the benefit of others; whose powers, as of a second preceptor of the Gods (Brihaspati), was recognised by others on account of his skill in devising and applying the means of politics that appear in suitable moments; whose own conduct was adorned by learning, valour, patience, prowess and good actions".

Nalanda seal

Bhaskaravarman's close connection with Harsha and Xuanzang led to his association with the famous Buddhist university of Magadha, for his seal has been discovered at the site of Nalanda in the company of two fragmentary seals of Harsha. The seals were found by Dr. Spooner during the excavation of the ruins of Nalanda in the year 1917–18. The text of the seal is as follows:

K.N. Dikshit, in his "Epigraphical notes of the Nalanda finds", thinks that the seal probably accompanied Bhaskaravarman's letter to Silabhadra inviting Xuanzang. As however it was found in the company of the two Harsha seals the probability is that both Harsha and Bhaskaravarman, on their march from Rajmahal to Kanauj, visited Nalanda together with the Chinese pilgrim and, to commemorate their visit, left their respective seals at the university.

Death
It is not known how or when Bhaskaravarman died, but it is estimated that his reigned ended about 650.

Legacy
Kumar Bhaskar Varma Sanskrit and Ancient Studies University of Nalbari, Assam has been named after him.

See also
 Pala Dynasty

Notes

References

 
 

 
 
 
 
 
 
 Kāmarūpa-Kaliṅga-Mithilā:a politico-cultural alignment in Eastern India : history, art, traditions by Chandra Dhar Tripathi, Indian Institute of Advanced Study
 

Varman dynasty
Hindu monarchs
600 births
650 deaths
7th-century Indian monarchs